The Mazda Xedos 6 and Eunos 500 are compact executive cars that were produced between 1992 and 1999, with the Xedos 6 being sold in Europe by Mazda, and the Eunos 500 being sold in Japan and Australia by Eunos. The cars were not sold in North America, with the larger Xedos 9/Millenia model offered there instead. In total, 72,101 Xedos 6 and Eunos 500 automobiles were produced.

History

The Eunos 500 was initially presented at the 1991 Tokyo Motor Show, and was based on the Mazda CA platform, also used by the Mazda Capella. The car entered full production in January 1992, with Japanese and Australian market models using the Eunos 500 name (as they were sold under the Eunos brand, and not the Mazda brand) and British models utilizing the Mazda Xedos 6 name. Left-hand drive versions of the Xedos 6, destined for mainland Europe, were first produced in 1993. The car's exterior styling was often praised by reviewers, with Honest John stating that it "could have been the prototype for a new small Jaguar - with Mazda reliability," however, the interior was also criticized for being too dull. There were also plans to market the car under the Amati 300 name, but they did not come to fruition.

The Xedos 6 was available with two different engines: a 1.6-litre straight-four (available in Europe from the beginning of production, in the UK from 1993 onwards) and a 2-litre V6 (available everywhere from the car's launch) The 1.6-litre engine produced , and was criticized for being underpowered, whilst the 2-litre engine produced , and was praised for its smooth, free-revving nature. The 1.6-litre versions, as well as the 2.0 Sport model, were withdrawn from production in 1998, a year before the remaining versions were withdrawn.

The Eunos 500 used different engines to the European models. In 1996, following Mazda's decision to axe the Eunos brand, the Eunos 500 was rebranded as the Mazda Eunos 500, and remained in production under that name until 1999.

Motorsport
The Xedos 6 was used in the British Touring Car Championship in 1993 and 1994. Roger Dowson Engineering ran the works Mazda team in 1993 (under the Mazda Racing Team name,) with the Xedos 6 replacing the 323F that had been used in the previous season. Patrick Watts drove the Xedos 6 during the season, taking his first pole at Snetterton, and three fourth-place finishes. He finished 15th in the championship, two points behind former champion Tim Harvey in the works Renault 19. Mazda were classified eighth, and last, in the manufacturer's championship.

For 1994, Roger Dowson Engineering and Team Dynamics ran the works Mazdas, with David Leslie and Matt Neal being entered in a two-car team, but the season would prove to be less successful. Neal was forced to withdraw from the series after suffering injuries from a big crash in the sixth round at Silverstone, whilst Leslie withdrew halfway through the season due to budgetary problems. Leslie's best finishes were a pair of eighth positions at the first two rounds, whilst Neal's was a tenth at Snetterton. Neal finished 23rd in the championship, level with privateers James Thompson and Nigel Smith, whilst Leslie finished 20th. Mazda were classified tenth, and last, in the manufacturer's championship. The Xedos 6's running gear was later used in a 323F built for the 1994 FIA Touring Car World Cup and driven by Neal.

References

Xedos 6
Cars introduced in 1992
Front-wheel-drive vehicles
Compact executive cars
Mid-size cars
Touring cars
Xedos 6

ja:マツダ・ユーノス500